A piazza is a city square in Italy, Malta, along the Dalmatian coast and in surrounding regions. 

Piazza may also refer to:

People with the surname 
 Adeodato Giovanni Piazza (1884-1957), Italian Cardinal of the Roman Catholic Church
 Callisto Piazza (1500–1561), Italian painter
 Honey Piazza, American piano player
 Ignatius Piazza (born 1960), founder and director of the Front Sight Firearms Training Institute
 Luigi Piazza (1884–1967), Italian operatic baritone
 Marguerite Piazza (1926-2012), American soprano and entertainer
 Marzia Piazza (born 1951), Venezuelan beauty pageant titleholder
 Michael S. Piazza, author and social justice advocate
 Mike Piazza (born 1968), American former Major League Baseball catcher
 Osvaldo Piazza (born 1947), Argentine football defender and manager
 Roberto Dipiazza (born 1953), Italian mayor of Trieste
 Rod Piazza (born 1947), American blues harmonica player and singer
 Tim Piazza (19972017), American student killed in college fraternity hazing incident
 Valeria Piazza (born 1989), Peruvian social communicator, model, and beauty pageant titleholder who won Miss Peru 2016 and Miss Universe 2016 semifinalist.
 Vincent Piazza (born 1976), American actor
 Wilson da Silva Piazza (born 1943), Brazilian football player

Places 
 Piazza al Serchio, Italian comune in Lucca, Tuscany
 Piazza Armerina, Italian comune in Enna, Sicily
 Piazza Brembana, Italian comune Bergamo, Lombardy
 Suncorp Piazza, Australian multi-purpose venue in Brisbane
 John Mackintosh Square, central town square in Gibraltar, colloquially known as The Piazza

Other uses
 Isuzu Piazza, small sporty 3-door liftback coupé 1981–92
 Piazza (web service), a social Q&A web service for classrooms
 La Piazza, Italian folk music group

See also

The Piazza (disambiguation)
 :Category:Piazzas in Italy
 ArtePiazza, a video game company of Japan
 Mike Piazza's Strike Zone, 1998 video game licensed by Major League Baseball
 Musica in piazza, 1936 Italian comedy film directed by Mario Mattoli
 The Light in the Piazza (novel), 1960, written by Elizabeth Spencer
 The Light in the Piazza (musical)
 The Light in the Piazza (film)
 The Piazza Tales (1856), a collection of short stories by Herman Melville
 L'Orchestra di Piazza Vittorio, Italian orchestra

Italian-language surnames